Kant with Sade is an essay by Jacques Lacan in which the author examines a link between the works of Immanuel Kant and Marquis de Sade. The original was published in the journal Critique in April 1963.

See also
Kantian ethics
 Seminars of Jacques Lacan
 Gaze
 Psychoanalytic theory

References

External links

1963 essays
Works about psychoanalysis
Works by Jacques Lacan
Books about Immanuel Kant
Works about the Marquis de Sade
Philosophy essays